Crossbarry is a small village on the R589 regional road in Innishannon parish, County Cork, Ireland. It is about 20 km southwest of the city of Cork. The River Owenabue flows through the village. The West Cork Railway once ran through the village, and Junction railway station served as a connection to Kinsale, just to the east. The Crossbarry ambush took place at the village during the Irish War of Independence.

It has two schools nearby (Gurrane and Knockavilla national schools), as well as other creche, childcare and playschool facilities. In 2007, the road from Bandon was improved, bypassing the Crossbarry ambush memorial.

See also
 List of towns and villages in Ireland

References

Towns and villages in County Cork